Amata phaeobasis is a moth of the family Erebidae. It was described by George Hampson in 1907. It is found in the Democratic Republic of the Congo and Uganda.

References

 

phaeobasis
Moths described in 1907
Moths of Africa